The Ramayana monkey chant, or Kecak, is a form of Balinese dance and music drama.

Monkey Chant, monkey chant or monkey chanting may refer to:

"Monkey Chant", a piece by Jade Warrior from Floating World
Monkey chanting, racist calls targeting sportsmen of African descent